North Lindsey  may refer to:
 North Lindsey College, college in Scunthorpe, North Lincolnshire, England
 North Lindsey Light Railway, light railway in North Lincolnshire, England
 North Lindsey Township, Benton County, Missouri, US